Sopron is a district in western part of Győr-Moson-Sopron County. Sopron is also the name of the town where the district seat is found. The district is located in the Western Transdanubia Statistical Region.

Geography 
Sopron District borders with the Austrian state of Burgenland to the north and west, Kapuvár District to the east, Sárvár District and Kőszeg District (Vas County) to the south. The number of the inhabited places in Sopron District is 39.

Municipalities 
The district has 1 urban county, 2 towns, 1 large village and 35 villages.
(ordered by population, as of 1 January 2012)

The bolded municipalities are cities, italics municipality is large village.

Demographics

In 2011, it had a population of 98,841 and the population density was 114/km².

Ethnicity
Besides the Hungarian majority, the main minorities are the German (approx. 5,500), Croat (1,800), Roma (750) and Romanian (200).

Total population (2011 census): 98,841
Ethnic groups (2011 census): Identified themselves: 94,241 persons:
Hungarians: 85,032 (90.23%)
Germans: 5,412 (5.74%)
Croats: 1,772 (1.88%)
Others and indefinable: 2,025 (2.15%)
Approx. 4,500 persons in Sopron District did not declare their ethnic group at the 2011 census.

Religion
Religious adherence in the county according to 2011 census:

Catholic – 55,943 (Roman Catholic – 55,662; Greek Catholic – 258);
Evangelical – 4,545;
Reformed – 2,544;
other religions – 1,128; 
Non-religious – 8,703; 
Atheism – 1,132;
Undeclared – 24,846.

See also
List of cities and towns in Hungary

References

External links
 Postal codes of the Sopron District

Districts in Győr-Moson-Sopron County